A Little South of Sanity is a live album by American hard rock band Aerosmith, released on October 20, 1998, by Geffen Records. The two-disc album features recordings taken while the band was on the Nine Lives Tour, which began in 1997 and was still ongoing at the time of the live album release, and the Get a Grip Tour, which the band was on tour from 1993 to 1994.

This release was the only Aerosmith album to receive the Parental Advisory sticker, primarily due to lead singer Steven Tyler shouting profanities in between songs and modifying some song lyrics to racier ones, although some other song lyrics had profanity in their original studio versions as well.

Production 

Shortly after the band reunited in 1984, they signed a contract to generate six albums for Geffen; three of these - the studio releases Done With Mirrors, Permanent Vacation and Pump - were finished before Aerosmith agreed to a contract with Columbia Records in 1991. The contract was not due to take effect until after Aerosmith's obligations to Geffen were fulfilled, but after the 1993 album Get a Grip was released, the band did not compose another studio album for the label. Instead, a compilation of their hits from the Geffen era, titled Big Ones, was put together and plans for a live album were conceived as Aerosmith went to Columbia.

Artwork  
Filmmaker Patrick Connolly claims that he inspired, and is depicted on, the album cover.  As a teenager, Connolly was the gas station attendant for Aerosmith drummer Joey Kramer when Kramer's Ferrari caught fire while refueling. At the time of the incident and for a time after, Joey Kramer was convinced that the fire was Patrick Connolly's fault. Connolly maintains that the cover of the album, released in October, 1998, features an image of a gas attendant who bears a resemblance to a teenage Connolly. He is convinced that the album cover artwork was intended to mockingly blame him for the July 15, 1998, incident. The fire was later found to be caused by a defective fuel line in the vehicle's gas tank.

Live sources 

There are no official listings to support where or when each performance was culled from; the CD booklet only mentions they were recorded during the Get A Grip and Nine Lives world tours. However, the recordings of "Love In an Elevator", "Same Old Song and Dance" and "Sweet Emotion" each have Tyler calling out to the live crowd, revealing where they were recorded. The first song has him mentioning the crowd in State College, Pennsylvania, the second a crowd in West Palm Beach, Florida, and the third a crowd in Seattle, Washington. A bootleg entitled Yokohama Arena 3/12/98 has "Last Child" being recorded at the same time as the title revealed to where the song was performed; also, Tyler says 'motherfucker' out loud as if it were edited in this live album. "Eat the Rich" was recorded from a live performance in Costa Rica in November, 1994, and "Dude (Looks Like a Lady) was recorded from a performance in Albany, NY, in January, 1998.

Track listing

Personnel
Steven Tyler – lead vocals, harmonica, percussion
Joe Perry – guitar, backing vocals, talkbox on "Sweet Emotion", pedal steel guitar on "Rag Doll", lead vocals on "Walk on Down"
Brad Whitford – guitar
Tom Hamilton – bass
Joey Kramer – drums
Additional musicians
Russ Irwin – keyboards, backing vocals
Thom Gimbel – keyboards, backing vocals

Production
Engineer: Jay Messina
Assistant engineers: Lawrence Manchester, John Wydrycs
Mixing: Jack Douglas
Mastering: Greg Calbi
Monitor engineer: Mike Sprague
Director: Jim Chapman
Photography: Moshe Brakha
Lighting design: Jim Chapman
Clothing/wardrobe: Sherry Willshire

Charts

Certifications

Release history

References

External links
 

1998 live albums
Aerosmith live albums
Albums produced by Jack Douglas (record producer)
Geffen Records live albums
Columbia Records live albums